Zhou Zheng (born 25 September 1997) is a Chinese footballer currently playing as a midfielder for Tianjin Jinmen Tiger.

Career statistics

Club
.

References

1997 births
Living people
Chinese footballers
China youth international footballers
Association football midfielders
China League One players
Shanghai Port F.C. players
Inner Mongolia Zhongyou F.C. players
21st-century Chinese people